Kalyana Agathigal is a 1985 Indian Tamil-language film directed by K. Balachander. The film stars Saritha. It was released on 13 April 1985. The film marked the acting debut of Nassar.

Plot 

The film begins with a group of six women who live together as friends after their attempt at living a successful married life is thwarted due to various reasons, majorly because of men, sexual abuse, dowry harassment,forced conversion and the backward society. They also form a music band called "Kalyana Agathigal" to raise funds for charity to the underprivileged. Ammulu, a young runaway girl, joins the gang of girls and becomes a part of the household. The story is about how their lives make wild twists and turns as they cope with the society and try to find true love.

Cast 
Saritha as Ammulu
Ashok as Robert
Y. Vijaya as Thangam
Vanitha Krishnachandran as Yesodha
Kuyili as Hemalatha
Lalitha Mani as Premalatha
Nisha Noor as Saira
J. Lalitha as Sumangali
Akalya as Thamizharasi
Seema as Valliammai
Raveendran as Ambikapathy
Delhi Ganesh as Ammulu's father
Poornam Viswanathan
Poovilangu Mohan as Gurumoorthy
T. S. Babu Mohan
Charle
Nassar as Kannayiram

Soundtrack 
The music was composed by V. S. Narasimhan and lyrics were written by Vairamuthu.

Release and reception 
Kalyana Agathigal was released on 13 April 1985, and failed commercially. Jayamanmadhan of Kalki wrote whether the film runs or runs away, Balachander's bravery will stand.

References

External links 
 

1980s Tamil-language films
1985 films
Films about women in India
Films directed by K. Balachander
Films scored by V. S. Narasimhan
Films with screenplays by K. Balachander
Indian feminist films